Wang Fulin (born 16 March 1931) is a Chinese television director and producer best known for his work Dream of the Red Chamber and Romance of the Three Kingdoms, both adapted from Four Great Classical Novels of Chinese literature.

Early life and education
Wang was born in Zhenjiang, Jiangsu, on February 1, 1931. He was raised in Shanghai. In May 1949, after the Communists over the Nationalists in Shanghai, he was accepted to the Shanghai Academy of Drama, majoring in acting. After graduation in September 1952, he was assigned to the Central People's Broadcasting Station (now China National Radio).

Career
In 1954, Wang made his directorial debut The Emperor's New Clothes, based on the short tale by the same name by Hans Christian Andersen.  

In 1959, he directed The New Generation with Da Yuanhuai, a television made by the state-owned China Central Television (CCTV) to mark the 10th anniversary of the People's Republic of China.

In 1962, Wang was transferred to the China Central Television as a television director, he directed Tinder in the following year.

In October 1979, Wang went to the United Kingdom to do investigation with a delegation of the State Administration of Press, Publication, Radio, Film and Television of China. After seeing the Shakespeare's plays, he began to write the screenplay of the Dream of the Red Chamber.

Wang directed Eighteen Years in the Enemy Camp with Du Yu in 1980, which is the first television series in mainland China.

In 1983, Wang was signed to direct Three-Dimensional People, which earned him a Golden Eagle Award for Best Television Series, the China Television Artists Association’s equivalent to the Emmys. The series is based on the novel of the same name by Jiang Zilong. 

Wang rose to fame after directing Dream of the Red Chamber, a television series adaptation based on the novel of the same name by 18th-century Qing dynasty novelist Cao Xueqin. Filming began in 1984, and it was released in 1987. It stars Ouyang Fenqiang as Jia Baoyu, Chen Xiaoxu as Lin Daiyu, Zhang Li as Xue Baochai, and Deng Jie as Wang Xifeng. He was awarded the title of "Top Ten Television Director of China".

In 1988, Wang was hired as director of The Story of Empress Dowager Xiaozhuang, for which he received an Outstanding Director Award at the 1st National Excellent Television Awards.

In 1990, Wang had been offered the job of directing Romance of the Three Kingdoms, adapted from the 14th-century Ming dynasty novelist Luo Guanzhong's classical novel of the same title. Production started in 1990 and ended in 1995. The drama stars Sun Yanjun as Liu Bei, Tang Guoqiang as Zhuge Liang, Bao Guo'an as Cao Cao, Wu Xiaodong as Sun Quan, with Wu Xiaodong, Lu Shuming, Li Jingfei, Wei Zongwan.

Wang directed Oh, The Mountain is the Mountain in 1999 and The Legend of Goubuli in 2004.

Filmography

Television

Variety show

Lyrics
 "Which Day We Will Meet"
 "The Dawn is on the Front"

Film and TV Awards

References

External links
 

1931 births
People from Zhenjiang
Living people
Chinese television directors
Chinese television producers